Princess Sophie of the Netherlands (Wilhelmine Marie Sophie Louise; 8 April 1824 – 23 March 1897) was the only daughter and last surviving child of King William II of the Netherlands and of his wife Grand Duchess Anna Pavlovna of Russia. She was heir presumptive to her niece, Queen Wilhelmina of the Netherlands, for seven years, from the death of her brother until her own death.

Marriage and children
Princess Sophie married her first cousin, Charles Alexander, Hereditary Grand Duke of Saxe-Weimar-Eisenach, at Kneuterdijk Palace in The Hague on 8 October 1842. Their mothers were sisters, and daughters of Tsar Paul I of Russia.

They had four children:
Karl August, Hereditary Grand Duke of Saxe-Weimar-Eisenach (b. Weimar, 31 July 1844 – d. Cap Martin, France, 20 November 1894), who married Princess Pauline of Saxe-Weimar-Eisenach.
Princess Marie Alexandrine of Saxe-Weimar-Eisenach (b. Weimar, 20 January 1849 – d. Trebschen, 6 May 1922), who married Prince Heinrich VII Reuss.
 Maria Anna Sophia Elisabeth Bernhardine Ida Auguste Helene  of Saxe-Weimar-Eisenach (b. Weimar, 29 March 1851 – d. Weimar, 26 April 1859)
 Princess Elisabeth Sybille of Saxe-Weimar-Eisenach (b. Weimar, 28 February 1854 – d. Wiligrad, 10 July 1908), who married Duke Johann Albrecht of Mecklenburg-Schwerin.

Catherine Radziwill, a contemporary of Sophie's, commented that,

"...[Sophie] was very different from her husband, and, though extremely ugly, was a most imposing Princess. She was clever, too, and upheld the reputation of the Weimar family. She was a Princess of the Netherlands by birth...and kept and maintained at her court the traditions in which she had been reared. Notwithstanding her want of beauty, moreover, she presented a splendid figure, being always magnificently dressed and covered with wonderful jewels, among which shone a parure of rubies and diamonds that were supposed to be the finest of their kind in Europe".

Ancestry

References

Sources

External links
 Royal House of the Netherlands

|-

1824 births
1897 deaths
House of Orange-Nassau
House of Saxe-Weimar-Eisenach
Nobility from The Hague
Heirs presumptive to the Dutch throne
Hereditary Grand Duchesses of Saxe-Weimar-Eisenach
Grand Duchesses of Saxe-Weimar-Eisenach
Princesses of Saxe-Weimar-Eisenach
Princesses of Orange-Nassau
Daughters of kings
Non-inheriting heirs presumptive